Kevin Hoddy (born 6 January 1968) is an English former professional footballer who played as a midfielder.

Career
Beginning as an apprentice at Fulham, Hoddy made 22 appearances in the Football League for them between 1986 and 1989. After leaving Fulham, Hoddy played briefly for Charlton Athletic, without making a first-team appearance, and in Belgium for Roeselare, before returning to non-League football in England with a number of teams including Welling United, Chelmsford City, Cheshunt, Barking, Ford United and Aveley.

References

1968 births
Living people
English footballers
English expatriate footballers
Fulham F.C. players
Charlton Athletic F.C. players
Welling United F.C. players
Chelmsford City F.C. players
Cheshunt F.C. players
Barking F.C. players
Redbridge F.C. players
Aveley F.C. players
K.S.V. Roeselare players
English Football League players
Expatriate footballers in Belgium
Association football midfielders